Abu 'l-Ḥasan ʿAlī b. ʿUthmān b. ʿAlī al-Ghaznawī al-Jullābī al-Hujwīrī (c. 1009-1072/77), known as ʿAlī al-Hujwīrī or al-Hujwīrī (also spelt Hajweri, Hajveri, or Hajvery) for short, or reverentially as Shaykh Syed ʿAlī al-Hujwīrī or as Dātā Ganj Bakhsh by Muslims of South Asia, was an 11th-century Sunni Muslim mystic, theologian, and preacher from Ghazna, who became famous for composing the Kashf al-maḥjūb, which is considered the "earliest formal treatise" on orthodox Sufism in Persian. Ali Hujwiri is believed to have contributed "significantly" to the spread of Islam in South Asia through his preaching, with one historian describing him as "one of the most important figures to have spread Islam in the Indian subcontinent." 

In the present day, Ali Hujwiri is venerated as one of the main walis of Lahore, Pakistan, along with Shah Hussain and Mian Mir, by the traditional Sunni Muslims of the area. He is, moreover, one of the most widely venerated saints in the entire South Asia, and his tomb-shrine in Lahore, popularly known as Data Darbar, is one of the most frequented shrines in South Asia. At present, it is Pakistan's largest shrine "in numbers of annual visitors and in the size of the shrine complex," and, having been nationalized in 1960, is managed today by the Department of Awqaf and Religious Affairs of the Punjab. The mystic himself remains a "household name" in the daily Islam of South Asia. In 2016, the Government of Pakistan declared 21 November to be a public holiday for the commemoration of the commencement of Ali Hujwiri's three-day death anniversary.

Background
Of Iranian stock, Ali Hujwiri was born in Ghazni, in present-day Afghanistan, in around 1009 to Uthman ibn Ali or Bu Ali. As is common with Sufi saints, his father, who was a direct descendant of Al-Imam Hasan ibn Ali. His genealogical chain goes back eight generations to Ali.
According to the autobiographical information recorded in his own Kashf al-maḥjūb, it is evident that Ali Hujwiri travelled "widely through the Ghaznavid Empire and beyond, spending considerable time in Baghdad, Nishapur, and Damascus, where he met many of the pre-eminent Ṣūfīs of his time." In matters of jurisprudence, he received training in the Hanafi rite of orthodox Sunni law under various teachers. As for his Sufic training, he was linked through his teacher al-Khuttalī to al-Husrī, Abu Bakr Shibli (d. 946), and Junayd of Baghdad (d. 910). For a short period, the mystic is believed to have lived in Iraq His brief marriage during this period is said to have been unhappy. Eventually, Ali Hujwiri settled in Lahore, where he died with the reputation of a renowned preacher and teacher. After his death, Ali Hujwiri was unanimously regarded as a great saint by popular acclaim. 

Ali Hajweri's orthodox version of Sufism is usually considered opposite to the more tolerant and humanist version of Bulleh Shah and Fariduddin Ganjshakar. Thus, one rarely see visitors from other faiths visiting his dargah while opposite is the case at the dargahs of Bulleh Shah and Fariduddin who are revered not only among Muslims but among Sikhs, Hindus and others as well. A Pakistani scholar noted "those who wish their offerings at Daata Saheb (dargah of Ali Hajweri) consider whirlers at Bulleh Shah as kafir (non-Muslim/ non-believer)."

Spiritual Lineage
Habib Al-Ajami
Daawūd al-Tai
Maruf Karkhi 
Sirri Saqti 
Junayd al-Baghdadi 
Abu Bakr Shibli
Ali Husri Husri
AbulFazal Khutli
Ali Hujwiri

Views

Companions of Muḥammad (صلی اللہ علیہ و سلم)

Abu Bakr
Ali Hujwiri described the first caliph of Islam Abu Bakr (d. 634) as "the Greatest Truthful," and deemed him "the leader (imām) of all the folk of this Path." Eulogizing Abu Bakr's piety, Ali Hujwiri praised him for how "he gave away all his wealth and his clients, and clad himself in a woolen garment, and came to the Messenger Muhammad " and stated elsewhere that he "is placed by the Sufi shaykhs at the head of those who have adopted the contemplative life." In conclusion, Ali Hujwiri stated: "The whole sect of Sufis has made him their patron in stripping themselvesan of worldly things, in fixity, in an  eager desire for poverty, and in longing to renounce authority. He is the leader of the Muslims in general, and of the Sufis in particular."

Umar
Ali Hujwiri described the second caliph of Islam Umar (d. 644) as one "specially distinguished by sagacity and resolution," and said that "the Sufis make him their model in wearing a patched garment and rigorously performing the duties of religion." He further praised Umar for his "very exalted station" in combining a life of worldly duties with intense and consistent spiritual devotion.

Uthman
Regarding the third of the Rightly Guided Caliphs of the early Islamic community, Uthman (d. 656), Ali Hujwiri stated that the "Sufis take Uthman as their exemplar in sacrificing life and property, in resigning their affairs to God, and in sincere devotion."

Ali
With respect to the fourth of the Rightly Guided Caliphs of Islam, Ali (d. 661), Ali Hujwiri stated: "His renown and rank in this Path were very high. He explained the principles of Divine Truth with exceeding subtlety.... Ali is a model for the Sufis in respect to the truths of outward expressions and the subtleties of inward meanings, the stripping of one's self of all property either of this world or of the next, and consideration of the Divine Providence." He also approvingly cited Junayd of Baghdad's saying: "Ali is our Shaykh as regards the principles and as regards the endurance of affliction."

Family of Muḥammad (صلی اللہ علیہ و سلم)

Hasan
Regarding the grandson of Muhammad and son of Ali, Hasan ibn Ali (d. 670), Ali Hujwiri described him as one "profoundly versed in [spiritual truths]" and as one of "the true saints and shaykhs" of the Islamic community.

Husayn
With respect to the younger grandson of Muhammad and son of Ali, Husayn ibn Ali (d. 680), Ali Hujwiri emphatically declared: "He is the martyr of Karbala and all Sufis are agreed that he was in the right. So long as the Truth was apparent, he followed it; but when it was lost, he drew the sword and never rested until he sacrificed his dear life for God's sake."

Jafar al-Sadiq
Ali Hujwiri described Jafar al-Sadiq (d. 765), the great-grandson of Husayn, as one "celebrated among the Sufi shaykhs for the subtlety of discourse and his acquaintance with spiritual truths."

Muhammad al-Baqir
Regarding the grandson of Husayn, Muhammad al-Baqir (d. 733), Ali Hujwiri stated: "He was distinguished for his knowledge of the abstruse science and for his subtle indications as to the meaning of the Quran."

Zayn al-Abidin
Ali Hujwiri praised Zayn al-Abidin (d. 713), the son of Husayn, for being of "the character of those who have attained perfect rectitude."

Doctors of law

Abu Hanifa
Regarding Abu Hanifa (d. 767), the traditionally recognized founder of the Hanafi school of orthodox Sunni jurisprudence, Ali Hujwiri stated: "He is the Imām of Imāms (lit. 'Leader of Leaders') and the exemplar of the Sunnis."

Ahmad ibn Hanbal
Regarding Ahmad ibn Hanbal (d. 855), the traditionally recognized founder of the Hanbali school of orthodox Sunni jurisprudence, Ali Hujwiri stated: "He was distinguished by devoutness and piety, and was the guardian of the Traditions of the Messenger. Sufis of all sects regard him as blessed. He associated with great shaykhs ... his miracles were manifest and his intelligence sound. The doctrines attributed to him today by certain anthropomorphists are inventions and forgeries; he is to be acquitted of all notions of that sort. He had a firm belief in the principles of religion, and his creed was approved by all the theologians.... He is clear of all [the slander] that is alleged against him."

Law and jurisprudence
As a Sunni Muslim, Ali Hujwiri believed it was a spiritual necessity to follow one of the orthodox schools of religious law, being himself a staunch follower of the Hanafi school of orthodox Sunni jurisprudence. As such, Ali Hujwiri condemned as "heretics" all those who espoused mystical doctrines without following all the precepts of the religious law (sharīʿah). He further denounced all those "who held that ... when the Truth is revealed the Law is abolished." For Ali Hujwiri, then, all true and orthodox mystical activities needed to take place within the boundaries of the religious law.

Dancing
According to Ali Hujwiri, purely secular dancing "has no foundation either in the religious law of Islam or in the path of Sufism, because all reasonable men agree that it is a diversion when it is in earnest, and an impropriety when it is in jest." As such, he censured "all the traditions cited in its favour" as "worthless." As for the legitimate ecstatic experiences of some Sufis, whose bodies convulsed when their "heart [throbbed] with exhilaration and rapture" on account of their intense love of God, Ali Hujwiri declared that these movements only outwardly resembled dancing and opined that "those who call it 'dancing' are utterly wrong. It is a state that cannot be explained in words: 'without experience no knowledge.'"

Poetry
Ali Hujwiri deemed it lawful to listen to virtuous poetry, saying: "It is permissible to hear poetry. The Messenger heard it, and the Companions not only heard it but also spoke it." Due to these reasons, he censured those who "declare that it is unlawful to listen to any poetry whatever, and pass their lives in defaming their brother Muslims." Regarding the hearing of secular poetry, however, Ali Hujwiri's opinion was far stricter, and he deemed it "unlawful" to hear poetry or love-songs that enticed the hearer to carnal desires through detailed descriptions "of the face and hair and mole of the beloved." In conclusion, he stated that those who regarded the hearing of such poetry "as absolutely lawful must also regard looking and touching as lawful, which is infidelity and heresy."

Saints
Ali Hujwiri supported the orthodox belief in the existence of saints. As such, he stated: "You must know that the principle and foundation of Sufism and Knowledge of God rests on sainthood, the reality of which is unanimously affirmed by all the teachers, though every one has expressed himself in a different language." Elsewhere, he said: "God has saints whom He has specially distinguished by His Friendship and whom He has chosen to be the governors of His Kingdom and has marked out to manifest by His Actions and has peculiarly favored with diverse kinds of miracles and has purged of natural corruptions and has delivered from subjection to their lower soul and passion, so that all their thoughts are of Him and their intimacy is with Him alone. Such have been in past ages, and are now, and shall be hereafter until the Day of Resurrection, because God exalted this community above all others and has promised to preserve the religion of Muhammad.... The visible proof [of Islam] is to be found among the saints and the elect of God."

Works

Kashf al-maḥjūb

Ali Hujwiri is perhaps most famous for writing what has been described as "the earliest formal treatise on Ṣūfism in Persian," the renowned Kashf al-maḥjūb (Unveiling of the Hidden). The work presents itself as an introduction to the various aspects of orthodox Sufism and also provides biographies of the greatest saints of the Islamic community. The Kashf al-maḥjūb is the only work of Ali Hujwiri that has remained until today. Egyptian Sufi scholar Abul Azaem has translated this work into Arabic.

Other works
Reynold Alleyne Nicholson provided a short list of Ali Hujwiri's writings (all of which are lost aside from the Kashf al-maḥjūb), which included, amongst others, the following unpreserved works: 
 Dīwān (Songs of Hujwirī), a collection of the saint's poems.
 Minhāj al-Dīn (The Way of the Religion), a work containing: (i) a detailed account of those Companions of Muhammad whom Ali Hujwiri deemed the precursors of the Sufis; and (ii) a full biography of the 10th-century mystic and martyr Mansur al-Hallaj (d. 922).
 Asrār al-khiraq wa 'l-ma'ūnāt''', a work on the woolen, patched garments worn by the Sufis of his time.
 An untitled work explaining the meaning behind the mystical sayings of Mansur al-Hallaj.
 Kitāb al-bayān li-ahl al-'iyān, a treatise on the orthodox interpretation of the Sufic ideal of Fana.

Of other books written by Sheikh Ali Hujwiri:
 Kashf al-Asrār'', a short Persian treatise on how to fully adopt the path of Tasawwuf, translated with in-depth commentary by El-Sheikh Syed Mubarik Ali Shah El-Gillani.

See also
Hajvery University

References

Sufi mystics
Punjabi Sufi saints
11th-century Iranian people
1000s births
1072 deaths
Hasanids
Hashemite people
Mystic poets
Sufi poets
Hanafis
Maturidis
11th-century jurists